The 1935–36 Montreal Canadiens season was the team's 27th season of play. The Canadiens slipped to last place in the Canadian division and did not qualify for the playoffs.

Regular season

This was a season of numerous changes. Leo Dandurand sold his share of the team and gave up the general manager and coach positions. Ernest Savard became general manager and Sylvio Mantha was made playing coach for the season. Johnny Gagnon returned to the club from Boston. Hector Blake made his debut for the Canadiens. Nels Crutchfield had to retire after an auto accident, and a benefit game was held for him in January 1936. Wildor Larochelle was traded to Chicago.

Final standings

Record vs. opponents

Schedule and results

Playoffs
The Canadiens did not qualify for the playoffs.

Player statistics

Regular season
Scoring

Goaltending

Awards and records
 Wilf Cude – NHL First All-Star team

See also
1935–36 NHL season

References

Notes

Montreal Canadiens seasons
Montreal Canadiens
Montreal Canadiens